The 1988–89 season of the Cook Islands Round Cup was the twenty fifth recorded season of top flight association football competition in the Cook Islands, with any results between 1951 and 1969 and also in 1986 and 1988–1990 currently unknown. Tupapa Maraerenga won the championship, their third recorded championship, although other sources suggest that their victories in 1992 and 1993 were won by Takuvaine and Avatiu respectively.

Results

League table
Tupapa Maraerenga topped the league which was played on a single round robin basis.

References

Cook Islands Round Cup seasons
Cook
football
Cook
football